Christian Mitchell is the incoming Vice President for Civic Engagement at the University of Chicago. He currently serves as Deputy Governor for Illinois Governor J.B. Pritzker’s administration. Prior to assuming that role, Mitchell represented the 26th District of Illinois as state representative from 2013–2019. He also served as the executive director of the Democratic Party of Illinois during the 2018 election cycle, becoming the first African-American to hold the position.

Mitchell began his career as a community organizer, working with churches on the south side of Chicago and is an advisor to many reform-minded political leaders.

Background, education, and early career
Mitchell was raised by his mother, a retired nurse, and his grandfather, who was a union steelworker and an elder at his church in Maywood. Mitchell cites his mother's dedication and sacrifice as well as his grandfather's service as his inspiration to become a public servant.

Mitchell attended the University of Chicago, graduating in 2008 with a B.A. in public policy. He later earned a J.D. at Loyola University in 2019.

Mitchell began his career as a faith-based community organizer with Southsiders Organized for Unity and Liberation (SOUL). His work with SOUL focused on education funding reform, affordable housing, and economic empowerment for low-income communities. In 2009, Mitchell drafted legislation that became the Urban Weatherization Initiative, a $425 million program designed to put people to work weatherproofing houses in Chicago.

In 2010, Mitchell worked as a deputy field director for Illinois Attorney General Lisa Madigan's reelection campaign and managed Will Burns' successful campaign for alderman of the 4th Ward. He was a senior advisor to Cook County President Toni Preckwinkle from May 2011 to November 2011, serving as Director of Outreach and External Relations. Preckwinkle credits Mitchell with keeping the Todd Stroger sales tax repeal from unravelling in the Cook County budgeting process. Mitchell was named to Chicago Mayor-elect Rahm Emanuel's transition team in March 2011.

In 2012, Mitchell acted as the Midwest director of Paid Media and Polling for President Barack Obama's reelection campaign. He worked as a senior vice president at The Strategy Group from 2014-2017, executing strategic communications plans for Democratic candidates across the United States. Christian has consulted for State Assembly and Congressional races across the country and was a senior advisor on Senator Tammy Duckworth’s successful 2016 campaign and Governor J.B. Pritzker’s successful 2018 campaign.

Illinois state representative
Mitchell was first elected to the Illinois House of Representatives in November 2012 and was sworn into office in January 2013. He was the youngest member of the 98th General Assembly. Mitchell was reelected to his seat in 2014, 2016, and 2018.

As a legislator, Mitchell was a leader in the fight to reform Illinois’ broken education funding formula. He worked diligently to pass the bill that increased resources for poor schools across the state by billions of dollars. In his capacity as Chairman of the Committee on Economic Opportunity, Mitchell fought to increase funding and access to state colleges. Mitchell also worked tirelessly to reform Illinois’ justice system: passing a law requiring background checks for private handgun sales, playing an important role in passing bills to reform the broken relationship between our communities and police, and leading the fight to decriminalize and legalize marijuana. He is a vocal advocate for a woman’s right to choose and affordable healthcare for everyone.

Committees served
Chairmanships and vice-chairmanships:
 House Committee on Economic Opportunity (Chairperson)
 House Committee on Cybersecurity, Data Analytics, and IT (Vice-Chairperson)

Committee assignments:
 Appropriations – Higher Education Committee
 Judiciary – Criminal Committee
 State Government Administration Committee

Subcommittee assignments:
 Appropriations – Cost Analysis Subcommittee
 Cybersecurity, Data Analytics, and IT – Distributed Ledgers and Cryptocurrency Subcommittee
 Judiciary – Criminal Administration and Enforcement Subcommittee
 Judiciary – Firearms and Firearm Safety Subcommittee
 Judiciary – Sex Offenses and Sex Offender Registration Subcommittee

Caucus memberships
 Black Caucus

Policy positions 
Mitchell was one of the most progressive members of the Illinois House of Representatives. On March 3, 2014, the Chicago Tribune  described Mitchell as "just what his constituents need: a smart, hardworking lawmaker whose first priority is to look out for them." He is known as someone who shows a deep understanding of Illinois' problems as well as a lawmaker who proposes a wide range of solutions.

Education
As a State Representative, Mitchell consistently supported legislation to direct more state funds to K-12 schools. In the 99th General Assembly, he proposed the Fund Education First Act as a long term solution to restore education funding in Illinois. The Fund Education First Act is projected to increase investment in Chicago Public Schools by $200 million without increasing local property taxes. In the long term, the proposed legislation will generate an additional $1 billion in funding to schools statewide. On Wednesday, October 30, 2013, Mitchell told Dartesia Pitts on CAN TV's Political Forum that he views "education as the key to opportunity, as a ladder out of poverty, as the thing that got me to the place where I am".

In his capacity as Chairman of the Committee on Economic Opportunity, Mitchell toured the state's universities during the 2015-2017 budget impasse, bringing attention to the economic importance of higher education to communities all across the state.  Mitchell highlighted the ability of colleges and universities to serve as anchor institutions – attracting new residents, providing employees for local businesses, and supporting local shops and restaurants. "The impacts are real and they are direct on the lives of real people," he said.

Mitchell consistently advocated increased state funding for schools, and particularly districts with large numbers of low-income students. He was a strong supporter of education funding reforms passed by the General Assembly in 2017, which increased state funding for education by $350 million – including $60 million for Chicago Public Schools. However, Governor Bruce Rauner vetoed the bill, and demanded $75 million in tax credits for private schools in exchange for his signature. Mitchell continued to advocate for increased school funding, but voted against the amended bill proposed by Gov. Rauner, denouncing the tax credits as vouchers by another name. Mitchell said: "[The bill] incentivizes the wealthiest citizens - instead of paying their fair share of taxes to fund public education - to take a tax break that will pull resources out of our public schools, and away from the funds that invest in infrastructure, human services, and property tax relief…public education is too important a concept to be traded away for the money that low income school children around the state deserve."

Mitchell supported legislation to establish an elected Chicago Board of Education. Currently the School Board is appointed by the Mayor of Chicago.

In 2018, Mitchell sponsored SB 2892, a bill to raise the minimum salary for teachers in Illinois - set at $9,000 since 1980. Mitchell's bill would have raised the minimum salary for teachers to $32,076 the following year, and $40,000 by 2022. The Illinois General Assembly passed Mitchell's bill in May 2018, with bipartisan support. On August 26, 2018, Governor Bruce Rauner vetoed the bill.

Gun control
In 2014, Mitchell called for the establishment of a Gun Trafficking Control Task Force to stop illegal guns from reaching criminals.  He introduced legislation that increases regulations on gun dealership to quell the spread of illegal guns, such as 24/7 video surveillance, mandatory background checks on employees working at gun dealerships, detailed record keeping, and zoning restrictions.  Representative Mitchell also proposed legislation calling for a 2% tax on the sale of ammunition to fund trauma centers in Illinois.

In 2018, Mitchell voted for HB 1467, a measure to ban bump stocks in Illinois. The measure was introduced after the 2017 Las Vegas Shooting, which was carried out by a lone gunman who used bump stocks to convert semi-automatic rifles into automatic rifles.

Job creation
Mitchell is vehemently opposed to Right to Work policies. In a speech from the Illinois House floor on May 14, 2015, he opposed an initiative to create local employment empowerment zones, stating "without unions, we wouldn't have an African American middle class. Because the African-American middle class in places like Chatham and Bronzeville was built on the backs of firefighters and teachers and unions". He supported the Fair Arbitration Bill (SB 1229), which would have allowed the State to reach a renewed collective bargaining agreement with its unionized employees through arbitration rather than a lockout or strike.

Mitchell was also the chief co-sponsor of HB 2607, the Illinois Clean Jobs Bill - a bill that will reduce carbon pollution and create 32,000 new jobs in Illinois.

Working families
Representative Mitchell supported numerous initiatives to relieve taxes on middle-class families in Illinois. He advocated amending the constitution to create a graduated state income tax, in which lower earners pay a lower rate and higher earners pay a higher rate. He also supported expanding the State Earned Income Tax Credit to reduce the tax burden on lower and middle income families.

In February 2015, Mitchell introduced a bill to guarantee that all workers in Illinois have the right to paid sick time. He also co-sponsored legislation which became law to expand access to SNAP benefits for families that include an elderly, disabled, or blind person.

In May 2018, Mitchell supported a bipartisan state budget. The state budget, passed by the legislature and signed into law by Governor Bruce Rauner, avoided property tax increases - a major selling point for Mitchell.

Environment
In the legislature, Mitchell has championed measures to preserve the environment and move Illinois towards a clean energy economy.

Mitchell was a chief co-sponsor of the Illinois Clean Jobs Bill, which will create an estimated 32,000 new jobs; lower electricity costs; and reduce the state's carbon footprint. Mitchell was a vocal supporter of a stronger Renewable Portfolio Standard, which steered a larger share of state investments to sustainable energy sources.

In 2018, Mitchell was the Chief House Sponsor of SB 3156, a bill to increase transparency around Illinois Environmental Protection Agency investigations.

In 2018, Mitchell's record on the environment earned a 100% rating from the Illinois Environmental Council. This marked the fifth time Mitchell received a 100% rating from the IEC.

Child care
Mitchell believes that state sponsored child care empowers single parents to provide for their families. In 2015, in response to Governor Rauner's drastic reduction of Illinois' child care program, Mitchell became the chief sponsor of legislation to expand state-subsidized child care to 200% of the Federal Poverty Level. This legislation expands access to the program for thousands of working families, particularly single parents and is a bill that Mitchell has carried since he was sworn into the General Assembly.

On November 17, 2015, Mitchell expressed his support for expanded child-care in an interview with Paul Lisnek, saying "I've got child care providers in my district who are shutting down. We've got businesses who are adjusting the way they do shifts because you've got so many single moms that are being crushed by the fact that they don't have child care anymore. So for us, voting for SB 570, which I was a chief co-sponsor, was insurance to say the governor can never do something like this again".

In March 2017, Mitchell introduced HB 3595, a bill that would create tax credits to help working parents cover child care expenses. "I think [the bill] could really be useful in moving the middle-class, lower-middle class forward in terms of having more money for child care and better quality child care in the state," Mitchell said of the bill.

Improved transparency in law enforcement and criminal justice reform
Representative Mitchell co-sponsored the Police and Community Relations Improvement Act, which expands access to body cameras, requires additional training for police officers and incorporates a measure drafted by Rep. Mitchell requiring police departments to conduct an independent investigation of police involved deaths.

Mitchell is an ardent supporter of criminal justice reform, recognizing the disproportionate effect current drug laws have on minority communities. He co-sponsored HB 218, legislation to decriminalize marijuana by eliminating criminal penalties associated with the possession of 15 grams or less of marijuana. The Illinois Department of Corrections projected this bill would reduce Illinois' prison population by 115 inmates and save $29,335,700 over 10 years. Governor Rauner vetoed the bill in August 2015.

Democratic Party of Illinois 
In July 2018, Mitchell was named Interim Executive Director of the Democratic Party of Illinois, the first African American serve in the role.  As Executive Director, Mitchell traveled to every corner of the state, listening to and soliciting feedback from voters on how they’d like to see the party grow and continue its record of electing Democrats in Illinois.

Working closely with the Democratic Party Chairman and the members of the Democratic State Central Committee, Mitchell took significant steps to increase Democratic performance in the 2018 elections. In concert with J.B. Pritzker’s campaign for Governor, the Party launched a $1 million voter registration program; executed a massive vote-by-mail program, targeting nearly two million eligible voters to ensure broader access and engagement during the traditional “drop-off” (non-presidential) midterm election year; and increased data sharing among campaigns from the top of the ticket to the bottom, giving down-ballot races access to additional data from which they could produce more sophisticated targeting and better-coordinated field operations.

Mitchell also hired a full time voter protection coordinator and created a voter protection hotline at the start of Illinois’ early voting period, creating the most sustained and far reaching voter protection effort in the state’s history.

Under Mitchell’s leadership, the Party spent more than $27M to support over 100 Democratic candidates and local Democratic party organizations in Illinois.  As a result, Democrats achieved gains up and down the ticket, including the election of J.B. Pritzker as Governor, securing two additional congressional seats, three additional state senate seats, and earning a super-majority in the state house and state senate - a “wave” election that would later be cited as “changing the course of Illinois politics.”

2018 Election / Democratic Gains in Illinois

Deputy Governor of Illinois 
On December 20, 2018, J.B. Pritzker announced Mitchell would be a Deputy Governor in his administration. Mitchell resigned from the Illinois House on January 11, 2019 to assume the position.

As Deputy Governor, Mitchell works to carry out initiatives set forth by the Pritzker Administration. His primary areas of focus are the Environment, Infrastructure, and Public Safety. The state agencies and departments under his oversight include the Illinois Department of Transportation, Capital Development Board, Environmental Protection Agency, Department of Natural Resources, Emergency Management Agency, National Guard, Department of Innovation and Technology, State Police, and Department of Corrections.

During what was regarded as Springfield’s "most momentous legislative session in decades", Mitchell was instrumental in the passage of HB 1438, Illinois Cannabis Control Act, which legalizes the adult use of cannabis in Illinois effective January 1, 2020. Mitchell, in concert with the sponsors and caucuses of color, not only worked to ensure that HB 1438 would generate much needed revenue, but also guaranteed that the Act was rooted in equality and justice.

The Illinois bill is noted for wrapping in "significant criminal justice reform" through a combination of clemency and expungement for a half million individuals that have been convicted of minor offenses. Criminal justice experts have referred to Illinois’ law as a possible “roadmap.” The bill also prioritizes social equity for potential business owners in the cannabis industry, including preference in licensing and a loan fund for owners disproportionately impacted by the war on drugs. Industry experts applaud actions taken by the Illinois legislature for “marrying increased opportunity, increased access [to] points of sale, while at the same time really giving the current operators, the current infrastructure the opportunity to be first to market.”

Other components of the law will expand mental health and addiction recovery services and reinvest in economic development, violence prevention, youth services, re-entry programs, and legal aid. The passage of HB 1438 makes Illinois the eleventh state in the nation to legalize the recreational use of marijuana and the first state to pass it through a general assembly vote instead of a ballot measure.

Also during the 2019 legislative session, Mitchell spearheaded efforts that led to the passage of “Rebuild Illinois”, the first-of-its-kind $45B Capital Construction Program. The historic program is projected to create over 500,000 jobs and put Illinois on a path to economic recovery by investing billions in the state’s infrastructure, mass transit, and universities and schools throughout Illinois. It will also fund environmental and flood mitigation programs, economic development, and expand access to broadband in rural areas. The bill also creates a requirement that 10 percent of hours worked on state construction projects be worked by apprentices - a key component for advancing diversity - and sets goals for minority participation.

During Governor Pritzker’s first legislative session, the legislature also passed an amendment proposal to the state constitution to allow for the implementation of SB 687, a bill which would (given approval through a state referendum) implement the first progressive taxation system in Illinois, as well as the state’s first agreed upon and enacted budget in a decade, a $15 minimum wage, a statewide expansion of gaming, legalization of sports betting, and passed the Reproductive Health Act, guaranteeing state funding for abortion.

Electoral history 
2018 General Election for State Representative, 26th District

2018 Primary Election for State Representative, 26th District

2016 Primary Election for State Representative, 26th District

2016 General Election for State Representative, 26th District

2014 Primary Election for State Representative, 26th District

2014 General Election for State Representative, 26th District

2012 Primary Election for State Representative, 26th District

2012 General Election for State Representative, 26th District

References

External links
Representative Christian L. Mitchell (D) 26th District at the Illinois General Assembly
Christian Mitchell for State Representative*
Rep. Christian Mitchell at Illinois House Democrats

1980s births
Living people
Democratic Party members of the Illinois House of Representatives
Politicians from Chicago
Politicians from Cook County, Illinois
University of Chicago alumni
21st-century American politicians